Siirt S.K. is a sports club located in Siirt, Turkey. The football club plays in the Iddaa League B. It was founded as Siirt YSE (Road Water Electricity) in 1969. It was renamed as Siirt Köy Hizmetleri in 1989, as Siirt Jetpa S.K. in 1999 and as Siirt S.K. in 2002.

League participations 
 Turkish Super League: 2000–01
 TFF First League: 1985–98, 1999–00, 2001–02
 TFF Second League: 1984–85, 1998–99, 2002–07
 TFF Third League: 2007–2014
 Amateur Leagues: 1969-84, 2014–2020

References 

 
Sport in Siirt
Football clubs in Turkey
1969 establishments in Turkey
Association football clubs disestablished in 2020
Süper Lig clubs
Association football clubs established in 1969